Kakira Airport  is one of the 46 airports in Uganda. It is in Kakira, Jinja District, Eastern Region. The geographic coordinates of this airport are 00 degrees, 29 minutes, 56 seconds north and 33 degrees, 16 minutes, 57 seconds east (latitude: 0.4990; longitude: 33.2825).

The airport is adjacent to the Kakira Sugar Factory and within the Kakira estate close to the main family residences on the Madhvani estate. It is a small private, civilian airport that serves the town of Kakira and the Madhvani Group. Its operations are privately administered and, as of December 2009, not by the Uganda Civil Aviation Authority.

Facilities

See also
 List of airports in Uganda
Transport in Uganda

References

External links
 Location of Kakira Airport At Google Maps
 Uganda Civil Aviation Authority Homepage
 

Airports in Uganda
Jinja District
Madhvani Group